The canton of La Sologne is an administrative division of the Loir-et-Cher department, central France. It was created at the French canton reorganisation which came into effect in March 2015. Its seat is in Salbris.

It consists of the following communes:
 
Chaon
Chaumont-sur-Tharonne
La Ferté-Imbault
Lamotte-Beuvron
Marcilly-en-Gault
Nouan-le-Fuzelier
Pierrefitte-sur-Sauldre
Saint-Viâtre
Salbris
Selles-Saint-Denis
Souesmes
Souvigny-en-Sologne
Vouzon
Yvoy-le-Marron

References

Cantons of Loir-et-Cher